Zoë Blake née Foster is an Australian author, skin care founder and entrepreneur.

Early life 
Zoë Foster Blake was born Zoë Foster on in Bowral, New South Wales, and was raised in Bundanoon, New South Wales.  Her father is the novelist David Foster.

Career 

Foster Blake has published work in magazines since 2002. She was deputy editor of Mania Magazine, Smash Hits Magazine, and beauty director at Cosmopolitan, Harper’s Bazaar, and the beauty website primped.com.au, which was acquired by News Corp in 2015. In addition, she has written the relationship advice column for Cosmopolitan since 2009, and wrote columns for Sunday Style magazine from 2013 until 2015. She started a beauty blog called fruitybeauty in 2006, and in 2015 it merged with her new site, zotheysay.com.

She launched a break-up app called Break-Up Boss in April 2017, which donates 10% of every sale to Safe Steps. She published the Break-Up Boss book in April 2018.

She is an ambassador for Tourism Australia, and Look Good Feel Better.

Writing 
Foster Blake has written eleven books and one Audible Original. Three non-fiction: Amazing Face, a beauty tips and tricks guide; Textbook Romance, a relationship advice book for young women co-authored with her husband Hamish Blake; and Break-Up Boss, which offers practical advice for the brokenhearted. She has also published four novels: Air Kisses, Playing The Field, The Younger Man, and The Wrong Girl. In 2017, she published her first children’s picture book, No One Likes a Fart.  It t won the 2018 Australian Book Industry (ABIA) Awards Children’s Picture Book of the Year. In 2020, Foster Blake published her second picture book, Back to Sleep, and in 2021 she published her third, Fart and Burp are Superstinkers, and her fourth, Scaredy Bath.

She is primarily published by Penguin Books Australia.

(2009) Air Kisses. Penguin Books Australia. .
(2011) Playing The Field. Penguin Books Australia. .
(2011) Amazing Face: clever beauty tricks, should-own products + spectacularly useful how-to-do-its. Penguin Books Australia. .
(2012) The Younger Man. Penguin Books Australia. .
(2014) Textbook Romance. (co-authored with Hamish Blake).  Penguin Books Australia. .
(2014) The Wrong Girl. Penguin Books Australia. 
(2016) Amazinger Face. Penguin Books Australia 
(2017) No One Likes A Fart. Penguin Books Australia 
(2018) Break-Up Boss. Penguin Books Australia 
(2019) Love! An Enthusiastic and Modern Perspective on Matters of the Heart. Penguin Books Australia 
 (2020) Back To Sleep Penguin Books Australia .
 (2021) Fart and Burp are Superstinkers. Penguin Books Australia. .

In November 2015, Network Ten announced it would screen a television show called The Wrong Girl in 2016, which was based on her novel of the same name. It ran for two seasons.

Skincare 
On 1 April 2014, Foster Blake launched a skincare brand, Go-To.  In 2016, she launched a men’s skincare line, Bro-To, and in 2019 she launched a children’s bath and body range, Gro-To.

Personal life 
In 2012, Foster Blake married Australian TV and radio personality Hamish Blake in a private ceremony at Wolgan Valley, New South Wales, Australia. They have one son, Sonny Donald Blake, born 10 May 2014, and one daughter, Rudy Hazel Blake, born 17 July 2017.

References

External links 
 

Living people
Australian women in business
Australian women writers
Australian writers
Year of birth missing (living people)